A Public Use Microdata Area, or PUMA, are geographic units used by the US Census for providing statistical and demographic information. Each PUMA contains at least 100,000 people. PUMAs do not overlap, and are contained within a single state. PUMAs were first created for the 1990 Census. For the 2012 American Community Survey (ACS), there are 2,378 PUMAs.

PUMAs allow the Census to publish census data for sub-state areas throughout every state. For example, the ACS publishes detailed data every year, but due to their sampling procedure only publishes data for census area that have more than 65,000 People. Only seven of the 55 counties of West Virginia were large enough to receive estimates from the 2006 ACS. In contrast, all 12 PUMAs that partition West Virginia received 2006 ACS estimates. 

The state governments drew PUMA boundaries for the 2000 Census, to allow reporting of detailed data for all areas. There were a total of 2,071 PUMAs in the 2000 Census.

See also 
 Census tract
 Census block

References

External links
 https://www.census.gov/acs/www/Downloads/Handbook2006.pdf
 https://www.census.gov/geo/reference/puma.html
 https://www.census.gov/geo/reference/gtc/gtc_pumas.html

United States Census Bureau geography